The Jeep Commander, also known as the Jeep Meridian in India, is a mid-size crossover SUV produced by Jeep since 2021. Based on the second-generation Compass, the vehicle is lengthened to accommodate three-row seating. It is mainly offered in emerging markets such as Latin America and India. The vehicle was introduced in Brazil in August 2021 and in India in April 2022. The Commander/Meridian is positioned above the Compass.

Overview 

Debuted on 27 August 2021 in Brazil, the Commander is built on the Small Wide global platform shared with the Compass. As the result, it is unrelated to the similarly named Grand Commander sold in China. During its introduction, it is claimed to be the only D-segment SUV produced in Brazil. The trunk volume of the Commander is 661 liters with the 5 seats up, 233 liters with the 7 seats in use or 1,760 liters when the second and third row seats are fully folded down.

In India, the vehicle was introduced in April 2022 and launched on 19 May 2022 as the Meridian. Production started in early May 2022. Only one engine option is available, which is the 2.0-litre turbodiesel engine.

References

External links 

Official website (Brazil)

Commander (2022)
Cars introduced in 2021
Mid-size sport utility vehicles
Crossover sport utility vehicles
Front-wheel-drive vehicles
All-wheel-drive vehicles
Cars of Brazil
Cars of India
Latin NCAP large off-road